The Shepard Street–South Road Street Historic District is a national historic district located at Elizabeth City, Pasquotank County, North Carolina. The district encompasses 161 contributing buildings in a historically African-American section of Elizabeth City.  The district developed from the mid-19th to mid-20th century, and includes representative examples of Greek Revival, Gothic Revival, Italianate, Queen Anne, Colonial Revival, Bungalow, and American Foursquare style architecture. Notable contributing buildings include the Sawyer–Pailin–Overman House (c. 1857), Antioch Presbyterian Church (c. 1896), (former) St. Catherine Catholic Church (1941), Olive Branch Missionary Baptist Church (1904), Corner Stone Missionary Baptist Church (1888), (former) St. Phillips Episcopal Church (1893), the Sundry Shop (c. 1881), Rex Cleaning Works (1932), Good Samaritan Hall (1896), and Republican Star Odd Fellows Hall (c. 1899).

It was listed on the National Register of Historic Places in 1994.

References

African-American history of North Carolina
Historic districts on the National Register of Historic Places in North Carolina
Greek Revival architecture in North Carolina
Gothic Revival architecture in North Carolina
Italianate architecture in North Carolina
Queen Anne architecture in North Carolina
Colonial Revival architecture in North Carolina
Buildings and structures in Pasquotank County, North Carolina
National Register of Historic Places in Pasquotank County, North Carolina